The 1948 Colorado gubernatorial election was held on November 2, 1948. Incumbent Democrat William Lee Knous defeated Republican nominee David A. Hamil with 66.33% of the vote.

Primary elections
Primary elections were held on September 14, 1948.

Democratic primary

Candidates
William Lee Knous, incumbent Governor

Results

Republican primary

Candidates
David A. Hamil, State Representative

Results

General election

Candidates
William Lee Knous, Democratic
David A. Hamil, Republican

Results

References

1948
Colorado
Gubernatorial